Pittosporum senacia is a shrub that grows naturally on the Indian Ocean islands of Madagascar, Mauritius, Seychelles and La Réunion.

References

senacia
Flora of the Western Indian Ocean